The Best Film... Ever! is a compilation released by EMI in late 2008. It contains what it perceives to be the best film music.

Track listing

CD 1
20th Century Fox Fanfare
James Bond: Monty Norman – "Main Theme"
Mermaids: Cher – "The Shoop Shoop Song (It's in His Kiss)"
The Full Monty: Hot Chocolate – "You Sexy Thing"
James Bond: Tina Turner – "GoldenEye"
Rocky: Survivor – "Eye of the Tiger"
Titanic: James Horner – "My Heart Will Go On (Instrumental)"
The Piano: Michael Nyman – "The Heart Asks Pleasure First"
The Godfather: Nino Rota – "Speak Softly Love"
The Pink Panther: Henry Mancini – "The Pink Panther Theme"
Casablanca: Herman Hupfeld – "As Time Goes By"
James Bond: Shirley Bassey – "Goldfinger"
9½ Weeks: Joe Cocker – "You Can Leave Your Hat On"
Four Weddings and a Funeral: Wet Wet Wet – "Love Is All Around"
Star Wars Episode IV: A New Hope: John Williams – "Main Theme"
Superman: John Williams – "Main Theme"
The Lord of the Rings: The Fellowship of the Ring: Howard Shore – "The Fellowship"
Love Story: Francis Lai – "Love Story (Instrumental)"
Wizard of Oz: Judy Garland – "Over the Rainbow"

CD 2
Underground: Goran Bregovic – "Kalasnjikov"
The Triplets of Belleville (Les Triplettes de Belleville): M – "Belleville Rendez-Vous"
Trainspotting: Iggy Pop – "Lust for Life"
The Graduate: Simon & Garfunkel – "Mrs. Robinson"
Highlander: "Queen" – "Who Wants to Live Forever"
Forrest Gump: Scott McKenzie – "San Francisco"
Footloose: Kenny Loggins – "Footloose"
Back to the Future: Huey Lewis and The News – "The Power of Love"
Ghostbusters: Ray Parker Jr. – "Ghostbusters"
Bad Boys: Diana King – "Shy Guy"
Flashdance: Michael Sembello – "Maniac"
The NeverEnding Story: Limahl – "Never Ending Story"
Mad Max Beyond Thunderdome: Tina Turner – "We Don’t Need Another Hero"
Pretty Woman: Roxette – "It Must Have Been Love"
Notting Hill: Ronan Keating – "When You Say Nothing at All"
Romeo and Juliet: The Cardigans – "Lovefool"
Godzilla: Jamiroquai – "Deeper Underground"
Bridget Jones' Diary: Geri Halliwell – "It's Raining Men"

CD 3
2001: A Space Odyssey: Richard Strauss – "Also Sprach Zarathustra"
Platoon: Samuel Barber – "Adagio for Strings"
The Good, The Bad and The Ugly: Ennio Morricone – "Main Theme"
Kill Bill: Nancy Sinatra – "Bang Bang (My Baby Shot Me Down)"
Dracula: Annie Lennox – "Love Song for a Vampire"
Angel-A: Anja Garbarek – "Can I Keep Him?"
Gladiator: Lisa Gerrard – "Now We Are Free"
Breakfast at Tiffany's: Henry Mancini – "Moon River"
Apocalypse Now: Richard Wagner – "The Ride of the Valkyries"
Lisbon Story: Madredeus – "Ainda"
Harry Potter and the Philosopher's Stone: John Williams – "Hedwig’s Theme"
Ben-Hur: Miklos Rozsa – "Parade of the Charioteers"
Finding Neverland: Jan A.P. Kaczmarek – "Impossible Opening"
Schindler's List: John Williams – "Schindler’s List (Orchestral version)"
Raiders of the Lost Ark: John Williams – "The Raiders March"
Ghost: Alex North – "Unchained Melody"
Batman: Danny Elfman – "The Batman Theme"
The Magnificent Seven: Elmer Bernstein – Main Theme"
Gone with the Wind: Max Steiner – Tara's Theme"

CD 4
Operacja Samum: Kayah & Goran Bregovic – "Śpij kochanie śpij" 
Wiedźmin: Robert Gawliński – "Nie pokonasz miłości"
Dlaczego nie: Kasia Kowalska – "Dlaczego nie"
Młode wilki ½ – Myslovitz – "To nie był film"
Ostatnia misja: O.N.A. – "Moja odpowiedź"
Ogniem i mieczem: Edyta Górniak & M. Szcześniak – "Dumka na dwa serca"
Przedwiośnie: Kayah – "Wiosna przyjdzie i tak"
Egoiści: Edyta Bartosiewicz feat. Agressiva 69 – "Egoiści"
Gry uliczne: Kasia Nosowska – "Jeśli wiesz co chcę powiedzieć"
Pan Tadeusz: G. Turnau & S. Soyka – "Soplicowo"
Tylko mnie kochaj: Goya – "Tylko mnie kochaj"
Stara baśń: Beata Kozidrak & K. Pietras – "Stara Baśń"
Na koniec świata: Justyna Steczkowska – "Na koniec świata"
Kiler: Elektryczne Gitary – "Kiler"
Nie kłam kochanie: Ewelina Flinta & Łukasz Zagrobelny – "Nie kłam, że kochasz mnie"
Zakochani: Natalia Kukulska – "Zakochani"
Qou vadis: M. Walewska, Fiolka, M. Bajor – "Dove, vai"

External links
 Album description 

Film
2008 compilation albums
Soundtrack compilation albums